Patrician Brothers' College, Blacktown is a Roman Catholic single-sex secondary day school for boys, located in Blacktown, a western suburb of Sydney, New South Wales, Australia.

History
The College was founded in 1952 by the Patrician Brothers to serve mainly rural families of Blacktown and its surrounding districts. The school is set on several hectares in the heart of the rapidly expanding Blacktown. Under a restructure the College saw its last Year 6 class graduate in 1997 and the first Year 11 cohort commence in 1998.  This led to an extensive building program with the addition of 11 classrooms, a technology block, library, school office and the Golden Jubilee Hall, as well as an amphitheatre finished in 2013.

House names
Patrician Brothers' College Blacktown have a proud and prestigious history. They have captured some of this history in the names of the college houses:
 The Delany Devils (Red) - Daniel Delany (1747–1814) founded the Patrician Brothers order at Tullow, Ireland in 1808 to educate the poor young people.
 The MacKillop Magpies (Green) - Blessed Mary MacKillop (1842–1909) was beatified in 1996 by Pope John Paul II. Canonised in 2010
 The Massey Marlins (Gold) - Bernard Massey as the Parish Priest of Blacktown, was responsible for the establishment of the college in 1952.
 The Histon Hounds (Blue) - Br. Gerard Histon was the founding Principal of the College in 1952. Died in 2010

College crest
The college crest consists of a Shield surmounted by a Crown and the motto Christus Regnat, Latin for "Christ Reigns".
The Shield represents the Catholic Faith, while the White Star encircled by the Wreath of Laurel represents The Blessed Lady.
The Cross and the Crown represent 'The Crowning Gift of Faith'.
Patrician Brothers' Blacktown is also known for its "brotherhood" attitude. The school is a largely multicultural group with many different cultures represented. A quote that has passed on for 59 years (since the school's inception) is: "Once a Pattie’s boy, always a Pattie’s boy."

Extra curricular activities
Patrician Brothers' Blacktown is known as one of the best sporting schools. The college takes part in the Metropolitan Catholic Schools (MCS) Competition and Combined Catholic Colleges (CCC) Tournaments. The school offers sports such as cricket, basketball, soccer, rugby league, touch football, rugby union, Australian rules football, golf, croquet, and swimming.

During the Arrive Alive Cup in 2007 Patrician Brothers Blacktown progressed to the grand final. The match was telecast on Channel Nine. The MCS Rugby League Competition officially declared Patrician Brothers' Blacktown the most successful MCS school.

The college is also known for its superb results in Public Speaking and Debating. In 2009, both the senior teams made it to the second quarter-finals of the CSDA debating competition the Year 9 Debating team were able to progress to the semi-finals. In 2011, the Year 12A Debating team took out the Catholic Schools' Debating Association Trophy, going through the competition undefeated. In 2013, the senior teams progressed to the finals. In 2019, the Year 9 Debating Team, had progressed through the metropolitan Sydney competition undefeated and took home the trophy of Year 9 Metropolitan Champions. 

The school has continuing success, and its community takes great pride in achievement.

Controversies

Former teacher Brother Martin Harmata pleaded guilty to sexually assaulting several boys including students at the school in the 1980s and was jailed for at least 3.5 years on 26 September 2013. Former Patrician Brother novice and relief teacher Alan James Pollock was also arrested on allegations of sexual abuse of students. Other teachers were reported as being 'under investigation'.

A third former teacher, a 57-year-old male, was arrested in February 2013 over offences alleged to have occurred between 1998 and 2002. The teacher has not been named.

On 18 December 2013, a fourth former teacher and brother, Michael Stanton, was arrested. Additional charges were laid against Michael Stanton in May 2014. The alleged offences occurred in 1980 against an 11-year-old boy. Michael Stanton pleaded guilty to the charges in October 2015.
Alan James Pollock pleaded guilty to committing sexual offences against children in September 2014, and was sentenced to eight years gaol in December 2014.

The Catholic Education Office has published statements concerning Alan Pollock, Brother Martin Harmata, and Michael Stanton following their convictions.

Notable alumni

 Josh Aloiai, current rugby league footballer for the Manly Warringah Sea Eagles  and Samoa and formerly the West Tigers
 Jake Arthur, current rugby league footballer for the Parramatta Eels
 John Asiata, current rugby league footballer for the North Queensland Cowboys and Samoa
 Luke Boyd, Australian Olympic boxer
 Jamie Buhrer, former rugby league footballer for the Manly-Warringah Sea Eagles, Newcastle Knights and New South Wales
 Bryce Cartwright, current rugby league footballer for the Gold Coast Titans
 Christian Crichton, current rugby league footballer for the Penrith Panthers and Samoa
 Stephen Crichton, current rugby league player for the Penrith Panthers and New South Wales
 Joshua Curran, current rugby league footballer for the New Zealand Warriors
 Sam Darley, current AFL player for the Western Bulldogs
 Brett Delaney, current rugby league footballer for the Leeds Rhinos and City Origin
 Jarred Farlow, current player for the Wests Tigers
 Anthony Field, The Blue Wiggle
 Andrew Fifita, current rugby league footballer  for the Cronulla Sharks, Australia, Indigenous All Stars and Tonga
 Jake Foster, current rugby league player for the Canberra Raiders
 John Folau, current rugby union player for the NSW Waratahs
 Tyrell Fuimaono, current rugby league player for the  St. George Illawarra Dragons
 Timothy Hodge, swimmer who represented Australia at 2016 Rio Paralympics 
 Masada Iosefa, former professional rugby league footballer for the Penrith Panthers, Wests Tigers and Samoa
 George Jennings, current rugby league footballer for the Melbourne Storm and Tonga
 Robert Jennings, current rugby league footballer for the Penrith Panthers and Tonga
 Sione Katoa, current rugby league footballer for Canterbury-Bankstown Bulldogs and  Tonga
 Albert Kelly, current rugby league footballer for the Brisbane Broncos
 Grant Lambert, ex-state cricketer for the New South Wales Blues
 Daine Laurie, current rugby league footballer for the Wests Tigers
 Spencer Leniu, current rugby league footballer for the Penrith Panthers
 Danny Levi, current rugby league footballer for the Manly Warringah Sea Eagles and New Zealand
 Luke Lewis, former professional rugby league footballer for the Cronulla Sharks, Penrith Panthers, City Origin, New South Wales and Australia
 Jeff Lima, former professional rugby league footballer for the Melbourne Storm, Canberra Raiders and New Zealand
 Matthew Lodge, current rugby league footballer for the  Brisbane Broncos
 Samuel Loizou, current rugby league footballer for the Parramatta Eels
 Jarome Luai, current rugby league footballer for the Penrith Panthers, New South Wales and Samoa
 Soni Luke, current rugby league footballer for the Penrith Panthers
 Taylan May, current rugby league footballer for the Penrith Panthers
 Terrell May, current rugby league player for the Sydney Roosters
 Tyrone May, current rugby league footballer for the Catalans Dragons and Samoa
 Junior Moors, current rugby league footballer for the Melbourne Storm
 Matt Moylan, current rugby league footballer for the Cronulla Sharks, New South Wales and Australia
 Brent Naden, current rugby league footballer for the Wests Tigers
 Arjun Nair, cricketer plays for Sydney Thunder in the Big Bash
 David Nofoaluma, current rugby league footballer for the Wests Tigers and Samoa
 Sean O'Sullivan, current rugby league footballer for the Penrith Panthers
 Joseph Paulo, current rugby league footballer for St Helens, Samoa and United States
 Daniel Penese, former professional rugby league footballer for the Penrith Panthers now currently playing for the Wyong Roos in the NSW Cup
 Ben Rogers, ex-rugby league footballer for the Penrith Panthers, South Sydney Rabbitohs, St George Illawarra Dragons and Newcastle Knights
 Sean Rooney, football player who plays for Salgaocar S.C. in the I-league
 Sean Russell, current rugby league player for the Parramatta Eels
 Jarrod Sammut, rugby league footballer for the Bradford Bulls and ex-rugby union footballer for Malta
 Tim Simona, former rugby league footballer for the Wests Tigers
 Chris Smith, current rugby league footballer for Penrith Panthers
 Izack Tago, current rugby league player for the Penrith Panthers
 Zeb Taia, rugby league footballer for the Newcastle Knights and New Zealand
 Jayden Tanner, current rugby league footballer for the Canterbury-Bankstown Bulldogs
 Jacob Townsend, AFL premiership winner with the Richmond Tigers
 Joseph Tramontana, current rugby league footballer for the Blacktown Workers Sea Eagles and Italy
 Sunia Turuva, current rugby league footballer for the Penrith Panthers and Fiji
 Siosaia Vave, current rugby league footballer for the Parramatta Eels and Tonga
 Dallin Watene-Zelezniak, current rugby league footballer for the New Zealand Warriors and New Zealand
 Matthew Wright, current rugby league footballer for the Manly-Warringah Sea Eagles and Samoa
 Jeremy Finlayson, AFL Footballer for GWS Giants

See also

 Catholic Education in the Diocese of Parramatta
 List of non-government schools in New South Wales
 Patrician Brothers

References

External links
 Patrician Brothers' College website
 Brothers' of St.Patrick

 Patrician Brothers schools
 Educational institutions established in 1952
 Roman Catholic Diocese of Parramatta
 Boys' schools in New South Wales
 Catholic secondary schools in Sydney
1952 establishments in Australia
Blacktown